John Hilton (March 12, 1942 – February 2, 2017) was a tight end in the National Football League who played from 1965 to 1973 for four teams, most notably the Pittsburgh Steelers (1965-1969).

Prep school and college 
He played college football for the University of Richmond. He prepared for college by attending Fork Union Military Academy as a postgraduate in the 1959-1960 academic year where he played football and basketball.

NFL career 
He was selected in the 6th Round (76th overall) of the 1964 NFL Draft by the Detroit Lions, but did not play for them before making his NFL debut with the Pittsburgh Steelers in 1965. He next played with the Green Bay Packers (1970) and Minnesota Vikings (1971), before returning to the Lions to play his last two years in the NFL (1972-1973). He went on to finish his career with the Florida Blazers of the WFL in 1974 after which Hilton moved into coaching.

Later life and death 
In 2008, John Hilton was announced as an inductee to the Virginia Sports Hall of Fame, joining fellow alumni from Fork Union, Sonny Randle and Rosie Thomas. He developed Alzheimer's disease and was in a period of declining health when he died after a fall on February 2, 2017.

References

External links
NFL.com player page

1942 births
2017 deaths
American football tight ends
Pittsburgh Steelers players
Green Bay Packers players
Minnesota Vikings players
Detroit Lions players
Sportspeople from Albany, New York
Florida Blazers players
Richmond Spiders football players
Green Bay Packers coaches
Washington Redskins coaches
Deaths from falls
People with Alzheimer's disease